Everything I Love is the fifth studio album by Canadian country music artist Jason Blaine. It was released on July 9, 2013 via E1 Entertainment. It includes the singles "Rock It Country Girl", "Feels Like That" and "Friends of Mine".

Critical reception
Stuart Derdeyn of The Province gave the album a B−, writing that "Blaine sounds as though he grew up on a steady diet of Tom Petty and AOR balladeers alongside his Nashville hats."

Track listing

Chart performance

Singles

References

2013 albums
Jason Blaine albums
E1 Music albums